The Presidency pro tempore of the Community of Latin American and Caribbean States is the office that represents the Community of Latin American and Caribbean States in international events.

List of pro tempore presidents

Notes

References 

 
Politics of the Caribbean
Politics of Central America
Politics of South America